Next Great Baker (also known as Cake Boss: Next Great Baker) is an American reality television series that airs on TLC, hosted by Buddy Valastro, the star of his own reality series, Cake Boss. Season 3 commenced airing on November 26, 2012.

, 36 episodes, including 2 specials of Next Great Baker have aired in four seasons.

Series overview

Episodes

Season 1 (2010–11)

Season 2 (2011–12)

Season 3 (2012–13)

Season 4 (2014)

References 

General references 
 
 
 

Next Great Baker
Next Great Baker
Next Great Baker